A. E. Kahn is the name of:
Alfred E. Kahn (1917–2010), American professor and expert in airline regulation
Albert E. Kahn (1912–1979), American journalist and socialist